The Women's basketball tournament at the 2019 Pacific Games was held in Apia, Samoa from 8–16 July.

Participating teams
Eight countries have qualified and are expected to compete in the women's basketball tournament:

Group stage
All times are local (UTC+13)

Group A

Group B

Final round

Classification 7th-8th

Playoffs

Classification 5th-6th

Semifinals

Bronze medal match

Final

Final standings

References

Basketball at the 2019 Pacific Games
Pacific